Adam Runnalls (born 3 October 1998) is a Canadian biathlete.

In January 2022, Runnalls was named to Canada's 2022 Olympic team. At the games, Runnalls was part of the relay team that finished in 6th, Canada's highest ever placement in the event.

Career results

World Championships

References

1998 births
Living people
Canadian male biathletes
Sportspeople from Calgary
Biathletes at the 2022 Winter Olympics
Olympic biathletes of Canada